Coup is typically used as the short form of the phrase coup d'état, a sudden overthrow of a government.

Coup or The Coup may also refer to:

Film and television
 "Coup" (November 17, 2019), a season 3 episode of The Crown
 "The Coup" (Smash), an episode of Smash
 "The Coup" (The Office), an episode of The Office
 The Coup, the former working title of the film No Escape (2015)

Literature
 The Coup (novel), by John Updike 1978
 The Coup, a play by Mustapha Matura 1991

Music
 Coup (album), a 2008 album by The New Regime
 The Coup, an American hip hop group

Other uses
 Coup (bridge), various techniques of play in contract bridge
 Counting coup, a Native American show of bravery
 Coup contrecoup injury, a type of head injury
 Coup d'oeil, assessing an entire situation in a glance
 Coup de main, a swift attack that relies on speed and surprise to accomplish its objectives in a single blow
 William C. Coup (1836–1895), an American businessman, partner of P. T. Barnum's
 Coup (game), a card-based social deduction game

See also
 Champagne coupe, a kind of Champagne glass
 Coop (disambiguation)
 Coup d'état (disambiguation)
 Coup de Grâce (disambiguation)
 Coupé, an automotive body style